Ismael "Izzy" Ortega is a fictional character appearing in American comic books published by Marvel Comics. The character was created by David Hine and David Yardin and debuted in the series District X, where he was partnered with the X-Man Bishop.

Fictional character biography
Ismael Ortega is a New York City police officer that was stationed in Mutant Town along with his partner Gus Kucharsky. After a horrible accident where a mutant woman uses her powers of persuasion to have Gus kill her husband, and herself (and an attempted suicide), Izzy gets a new partner: the X-Man Bishop. They have several events to deal with during the series, including: stopping the drug trafficking of a mutant drug called "Toad Juice", trying to intervene in a gang war between rival mob bosses "Filthy" Frankie Zapruder and Daniel "Shaky" Kaufman, discovering and stopping a group of tunnel dwelling mutants (who are not the Morlocks) that are murdering innocents, as well as keeping an eye on the mysterious Mister M and finding who put a hit out on him.

Aside from work, Izzy also has two young children — Chamayra and Esteban — and a wife named Armena who is a mutant. One afternoon Izzy left his gun at home and it was found by his son Esteban. The boy accidentally shot his sister and she would have died if not for the intervention of Mister M, who removed the bullet and sealed the wound.

This caused a lot of tension in his marriage, and instead of dealing with his problems Izzy ran into the arms of Lara the Illusionist.

With the Scarlet Witch going mad and restructuring reality in the House of M storyline, Mutant Town became the mutant paradise Mutopia X. Izzy was one of the few high-ranking humans, and the main tension of the series was between him and his wife. They were trying to decide whether or not to let Chamayra go through the Rite of Transformation which would unearth her mutant potential. Izzy found the idea that normalcy was shunned —in fact it was considered a medical condition— appalling, whereas his wife wanted their daughter to go through with it. Like the main Marvel Universe, Chamayra was shot but this time Mr. M was not able to help her, since she was already dead. The reality later reverted to its proper order, but Chamayra had an odd side-effect: she was suffering from massive internal bleeding, like she had been shot with an "invisible bullet". Izzy ran to get Mr. M to help his daughter again, but it turned out to be a replay of the House of M: they arrived too late to save her. Distraught, Izzy was contemplating suicide until Bishop came and convinced him to consider his family. At the end of the series, Armena, now human, and Izzy reconciled. It is unlikely that Izzy continued his job at the police department, because at the end of the series he vowed never to use a gun again.

References

External links
Uncannyxmen.net issue summaries of the complete District X series
Uncannyxmen.net issue summaries of the complete Mutopia X series
Uncannyxmen.net character bio on Izzy Ortega

Ortega, Ismael
Ortega, Ismael